Oscar De La Hoya vs. Floyd Mayweather Jr., billed as The World Awaits, was a super welterweight superfight that took place on May 5, 2007, at the MGM Grand Arena in Las Vegas, Nevada between six-division world champion Oscar De La Hoya and undefeated four-division champion Floyd Mayweather Jr.. At the time, the bout was the most lucrative boxing match ever, with over $130 million in generated revenue. 

Mayweather Jr. won by split decision over De La Hoya in 12 rounds, capturing the WBC super welterweight title.

Details
The fight took place at the MGM Grand Garden Arena in Las Vegas, Nevada under the promotion of Golden Boy Promotions. It was contested at 154 pounds, with De La Hoya defending his WBC light middleweight championship.

Tickets sold out three hours after they went on sale on Saturday, January 27, 2007. With the sellout, the bout generated over $19 million in live gate, beating the previous record of $16,860,300 set by the June 28, 1997, heavyweight championship rematch between Evander Holyfield and Mike Tyson at the Thomas & Mack Center.

The fight was televised on HBO pay-per-view, with the cost to watch the fight at $55 in the U.S.

Mayweather won by a split decision in 12 close-fought rounds, capturing the World Boxing Council (WBC) title. Judges Jerry Roth (115–113) and Chuck Giampa (116–112) scored the fight for Mayweather while judge Tom Kaczmarek had De La Hoya winning, 115–113.

Hype
As part of the buildup for the fight, HBO produced an unprecedented four-part prelude. The series, titled De La Hoya-Mayweather 24/7, aired installments on the final three Sundays of April, with the fourth installment airing on Thursday, May 3, two days before the fight. The series focused on each fighter's training and preparation for the bout.

A subplot to the fight concerned whether De La Hoya would be trained by Floyd Mayweather Sr., the estranged father of Mayweather Jr. Mayweather Sr. had served as De La Hoya's trainer since 2001. Mayweather Sr. announced his willingness to train De La Hoya after initially declining to oppose his son, but demanded a $2 million fee in light of the enormous revenue to be generated by the fight. De La Hoya declined to meet Mayweather Sr.'s demands, making a counteroffer of $500,000 guaranteed plus an additional $500,000 contingent on De La Hoya winning the fight. Ultimately, the sides were unable to come to an agreement and De La Hoya hired the highly respected Freddie Roach to be his cornerman instead.

Although Mayweather Sr. reunited with his son at the start of Floyd Jr.'s training camp, he had no official role, as Floyd Jr. opted to retain his uncle, Roger Mayweather, as his trainer instead. Mayweather Sr. left the camp by the end of April, upset over not being chosen as trainer and by comments made by his son and brother during the taping of the 24/7 show.

Undercard

Result

Result: Floyd Mayweather Jr. defeats Oscar De La Hoya by split decision

Fight earnings
The De La Hoya-Mayweather fight set the record for most PPV buys for a boxing match with 2.4 million households, beating the previous record of 1.99 million for Evander Holyfield-Mike Tyson II. Around $136 million in revenue was generated by the PPV. It was surpassed in 2015 by Mayweather vs. Pacquiao, which generated more than 400 million dollars from 4.6 million households in PPV buys, thus becoming the most lucrative fight in history and one of the most lucrative sport events of all time. Factoring in the percentages, Mayweather earned $25 million for the fight whereas Oscar De La Hoya ended up earning $52 million, the highest purse ever for a fighter at the time. Mayweather ended up surpassing those earnings in 2013 with a purse of $88 million for Mayweather vs. Álvarez. The previous record had been $35 million, held by Tyson and Holyfield.

September 20 rematch
De la Hoya and Mayweather were scheduled for a rematch on September 20, 2008. However, unlike the first fight, the fight would have been contracted for 147 lbs. or the welterweight limit. The first fight was contracted at light middleweight or 154 lbs and de la Hoya's WBC junior middleweight title was on the line. However, Mayweather would have come in as champion and defended his WBC/The Ring welterweight titles. As a tune-up fight, De la Hoya fought Stephen Forbes (33–6) on May 3, with Floyd Mayweather Sr. as his trainer. De La Hoya (39–5, 30 KOs) looked extremely sluggish but ultimately won a unanimous decision over Forbes, 119–109, 119–109 and 120–108.

The rematch never took place due to Mayweather's retirement in 2008 and De La Hoya's retirement in 2009, although Mayweather would return to boxing in 2009, eventually retiring for good in 2017.

References

Mayweather
2007 in boxing
Boxing in Las Vegas
2007 in sports in Nevada
Golden Boy Promotions
May 2007 sports events in the United States
Boxing matches involving Floyd Mayweather Jr.
MGM Grand Garden Arena
Nicknamed sporting events
Events in Paradise, Nevada